Kočani medieval towers are located in Kocani, North Macedonia. They were probably built in the second half of the 17th century, when the city was under Ottoman administration. Impact in construction had oriental architecture.

According to current findings, in Kočani and its immediate surroundings were built three medieval towers, two of which are located in the city, situated on both banks of the Kočani river, while the third is located in the village of Dolni Podlog. Those were bey's residential towers. In fact, those residential towers had defensive position, and one of them was used as a clock tower. It is located near the elementary school "Rade Kratovce and served to indicate the hours by sound in earlier times.

Constructed of massive walls of stone, they left until nowadays as the signs of the past of Kočani. In 1957, the National Authority for Protection of Monuments put under the Law protection both towers in the city.

Renovation and function

The medieval tower, located on the right bank of the river in the downtown area, situated between residential buildings, is dominant in space with its height by 18.5 meters. In 1978 the City Council made a decision for revitalization, after which the tower may be used again.

Current position of the tower:

 Basement - sanitation;
 Ground floor - numismatic collection;
 I floor - archaeological collection;
 II floor - library;

Unfortunately, the tower on the left side of the river has not been amended and is in poor condition. Currently it has no purpose.

Archaeological sites in North Macedonia
Kočani
Towers in North Macedonia
Tower houses